The Adventures of Ch!pz is the debut album from Dutch pop group Ch!pz. It was released on 4 February 2004, in the Netherlands, but in 2005 in Austria, Switzerland, and Germany. As result of the success of the album and its singles in the countries near the Netherlands, they started to release their singles in the Scandinavian countries in 2006 too.

Track listing
"Cowboy" – 2:52
"Captain Hook" – 3:14
"Bang Bang" – 3:14
"Ch!pz in Black (Who You Gonna Call?)" – 3:02
"Say I'm Ur No 1" – 2:51
"Milky Way" – 3:14
"The Haunted House" – 3:18
"4 Who U R" – 3:57
"The Happy Hook" – 3:38
"Jungle Beat" – 3:08
"Slay Slay" – 3:28
"The Timeriders" – 3:38

Charts

Weekly charts

Year-end charts

Singles

Weekly charts

Year-end positions

References

2004 debut albums
Ch!pz albums
Universal Records albums